Huang Shengyi (born February 11, 1983), also known as Eva Huang, is a Chinese actress and singer.

Early life and education
Huang was born and raised in Shanghai. Her father was educated in the United States and lived there in the early 1990s, while her mother worked as an editor in a newspaper agency in Shanghai. She graduated from the Beijing Film Academy in 2001.

Career
Eva Huang rose to fame after starring in Stephen Chow's action comedy film Kung Fu Hustle (2004). Kung Fu Hustle took a record 155 million yuan at box offices across the Chinese mainland, making it China's top-grossing film in 2004. In August the following year, she ended her contract with Chow's company after appearing in a magazine photo shoot without their consent.

Huang then starred in Dragon Squad (2005), which received critical acclaim and was among the first films to be listed in the permanent collection by the National Museum of China.

Starting in 2006, Huang worked with China Juli Group on a number of television series, including Fairy Couple (2007) and The Shadow of Empress Wu (2007). Fairy Couple was the highest rated drama of the year, and led to increased recognition for Huang. She also starred in the television adaptation of Louis Cha's novel Sword Stained with Royal Blood.

In 2008, Huang released her first solo album, titled Huang Shengyi.

In 2009, Huang became the CEO of China Juli Group's Entertainment Media Co., Ltd, drawing a six-figure salary annually. The same year, she appeared in a minor role in the Hollywood science fiction film Race to Witch Mountain.

In 2011, Huang starred alongside Jet Li and Raymond Lam in The Sorcerer and the White Snake where she played the White Snake Demon. She then starred in The Locked Door (2012), a film which tells about the life story of a girl from noble family, who was raped at young age. The film won the Best Feature at the Monaco Charity Film Festival.

In 2013, Huang starred in the romance drama Marriage Rules.
This is the first production created by Huang's own studio, and it was a commercial and ratings success.

In 2014, Huang starred alongside Donnie Yen in the action comedy film Iceman, which won her the Best Actress award at the Huading Awards for her performance.

In 2015, Huang was cast in the war epic film Air Strike.

Filmography

Film

Television series

Variety show

Discography

Albums

Singles

Awards

References

External links
 

1983 births
Beijing Film Academy alumni
Chinese film actresses
Chinese television actresses
Living people
Singers from Shanghai
Actresses from Shanghai
21st-century Chinese actresses
21st-century Chinese women singers